Marcel Lehoux (3 April 1888 – 19 July 1936) was a French racing driver and businessman.

Lehoux was born in Blois in France. His racing career was built on the back of his successful trading company that operated in French Algeria. He placed second at the Grand Prix de la Marne at Reims in 1929, behind Zenelli and ahead of his friend, Philippe Étancelin, making a Bugatti sweep of the podium. At the 1930 Algerian Grand Prix, he followed Étancelin home to second. In 1931, he shared a Bugatti with Étancelin for both the Italian and French Grands Prix, events of 10 hours duration, run to Formula Libre rules; the duo dropped out both times. He would later race for Bugatti and Scuderia Ferrari racing teams.

Lehoux died after a collision in the 1936 Deauville Grand Prix.

Racing record

Grand Prix wins

Complete European Championship results
(key) (Races in bold indicate pole position) (Races in italics indicate fastest lap)

References

Review of the 1936 Deauville Grand Prix, with images and film

External resources
Review of the 1936 Deauville Grand Prix with sources and images

1888 births
1936 deaths
French racing drivers
Algerian racing drivers
Grand Prix drivers
Racing drivers who died while racing
Sport deaths in France
European Championship drivers